Foteino ( []) is a village (community) in the municipal unit of Kompoti in the regional unit of Arta, Greece. In 2011 its population was 178.

History
The old name of the village, Hósiana, appears for the first time in 1696, in a historic document in which the villages of Arta asked the Venetian Republic for protection from pirates.

In 1899, a new church was built by destroying a small old one, dating to the early 12th century

The village was constituted as a separate commune with the 186/10.08.1947 government gazette (ΦΕΚ). Until then it was part of the commune of Ano-Petra. With ΦΕΚ 195/23.07.1953, its name changed from Hosiana to Fotino, and with law 2539/1997, as part of the Kapodistrias reforms, the commune became a municipal district of the municipality of Kompoti.

Gallery

See also
 Kompoti
 Sellades
 Menidi
 Ambracian Gulf
 Ionian Sea
 Arachthos River

External links
 The municipality of Kompoti

Footnotes 

Populated places in Arta (regional unit)